MG Alfred A. Valenzuela is a retired United States Army major general who commanded United States Army South (USARSO) at Fort Buchanan, Puerto Rico and San Antonio, Texas. Served as Deputy Commanding General DCINC ) US Southern Command, Panama/Miami. 

Served in Kuwait with 3d Infantry Division.

Awards and decorations
His decorations include the Defense Distinguished Service Medal, Army Distinguished Service Medal, Defense Superior Service Medal, Legion of Merit (with three Oak Leaf Clusters), Soldier's Medal for Heroism , Bronze Star with "V" device, Defense Meritorious Service Medal, Meritorious Service Medal (with two Oak Leaf Clusters), Joint Service Commendation Medal, Army Commendation Medal (with Oak Leaf Cluster), Joint Service Achievement Medal, Army Achievement Medal, Armed Forces Expeditionary Medal, Humanitarian Service Medal and the Joint Meritorious Unit Award (3rd award).

  Defense Distinguished Service Medal
  Army Distinguished Service Medal
  Defense Superior Service Medal
  Legion of Merit with three oak leaf clusters
  Soldier's Medal for Heroism.
  Bronze Star with Valor Device for Valor in combat.
  Defense Meritorious Service Medal
  Meritorious Service Medal with two oak leaf clusters
  Joint Service Commendation Medal
  Army Commendation Medal with oak leaf cluster
  Joint Service Achievement Medal
  Army Achievement Medal
  Armed Forces Expeditionary Medal
  Humanitarian Service Medal
  Joint Meritorious Unit Award with two oak leaf clusters
Served in Haiti, Colombia, Korea, Peru, Turkey, Germany, Kuwait, Grenada, Puerto Rico, Panama, El Salvador, Somalia & numerous Joint & InterAgency assignments.
served in 6 Infantry Divisions & 3 Combat Corps

Civilian career
He is a Senior Consultant for the Center of Terrorism Law at St. Mary's University School of Law.

He wrote the book No Greater Love: The Lives & Times of Hispanic Soldiers with Jason Lemons.

Major contributor to the book entitled " Right Before Our Eyes: Latinos Past, Present & Future"

He is the Senior Military Advisor to the Warrior Defense Project, part of the St. Mary's Law School

He wrote: The Essence and Variation of Soldiers in Politics: A Dimensional Typology of Latin American Leadership and Regimes

Recently appointed by the Texas Supreme Court to the Texas Access Judicial Commission: co-chair of Veterans committee

Personal life
Valenzuela is married to Esther Valenzuela and they have two children. Lori Valenzuela is a Justice of the 4th Court of Appeals. Served as Criminal District Court Judge for 10 years & was the co founder of the Veterans Felony Treatment Court. Alfred II is a Senior Program manager in the Edicational arena.

Other Awards
Eagle Scout
 Hall of Fame: Thomas Jefferson High School
  Distinguished Alumni St. Mary's University
 Hall of Fame of the Boy's & Girls Club of America
 Named "One of the Most 100 Influential Hispanics" by Hispanic Business Magazine.

Philanthropy and civic engagement
He is currently serving as a commissioner for The World War One Centennial Commission.
He is serving as the Co-Chair of the Military Advisory Council of America 250. They are the military arm of the U.S. Semiquincentennial Congressional Commission.
Has an Educational Foundation that gives scholarships to Soldiers children that he buried from the Iraq/Afghanistan wars.

See also

References

Recently named to the Military Advisory Council to America 250, for the Presidential Semi Quintennial Commission

External links
Command Run US Southern Command, June 2000
News Release, May 2000
Command Run US Southern Command, April 2001
Valenzuela interview, Hispanic Magazine, April 2000

Living people
Jefferson High School (San Antonio, Texas) alumni
United States Army generals
American people of Mexican descent
Recipients of the Distinguished Service Medal (US Army)
Recipients of the Legion of Merit
Recipients of the Soldier's Medal
Recipients of the Defense Superior Service Medal
St. Mary's University, Texas alumni
Recipients of the Defense Distinguished Service Medal
People from San Angelo, Texas
1948 births
Recipients of the Humanitarian Service Medal
Military personnel from Texas